Wayne State University Department of Computer Science is part of the College of Engineering. The department offers core academic strength in many areas including artificial intelligence, bioinformatics, data mining and machine learning, networking, databases, distributed and parallel computing, computer security, computer graphics and visualizations, and software engineering. 
Undergraduate (Bachelor of Science and Bachelor of Arts) and graduate degrees (Master of Science and PhD) in Computer Science, as well as an undergraduate degree in Information Systems Technology and a certificate in Scientific Computing are offered in the department.  In addition, graduate students have the opportunity to complete their Ph.D. work in Computer Science with a concentration in Bioinformatics and Computational Biology.

Undergraduate curriculum includes a high degree of hands-on experience with real-world systems, increased personal attention; undergraduate participation in research projects. Undergraduate students have the opportunity to choose among a variety of concentrations including Software Engineering, Databases, Web Technology and Computer Gaming.  Study abroad opportunities are available with European schools including the École Polytechnique de l'Université de Nantes, France.

The Department of Computer Science is a major focus for interdisciplinary activities within the university with annual R&D expenditures are between $2 and $3 million.  The Department's commitment to community service includes a new joint degree program with Focus: HOPE, as well as offering summer computer camps for middle and high school students.

It is located in the Maccabees Building, in Detroit

References

External links 
 Wayne State University Department of Computer Science

Computer Science Department
Computer science departments in the United States
Science and technology in Michigan